Ivan Miloš Havel  (11 October 1938 – 25 April 2021) was a Czech scientist and philosopher. He was the brother of President Václav Havel, with whom he was one of the founders of the Civic Forum.

In years 1990–2019, he was the editor-in-chief of Vesmír.

In a joint award for 2019/2020 commemorating the 30th Anniversary of the fall of Communism, Havel was awarded the Hanno R. Ellenbogen Citizenship Award with Ivan Chvatik (19th) and Hans-Dietrich Genscher and Markus Meckel (20th) by the Prague Society and Global Panel Foundation.

References

External links
 
 Memory of nations: Doc. Ivan Miloš Havel

1938 births
2021 deaths
Czechoslovak scientists
Czech philosophers
Civic Forum politicians
Czech Technical University in Prague alumni
University of California, Berkeley alumni
Academic staff of Charles University
People from Prague